Lydia is a feminine first name. It derives from the Greek Λυδία, Ludía, from λυδία (ludía; "beautiful one", "noble one", "from Lydia/Persia"), a feminine form of the ancient given name Λυδός (Lydus). The region of Lydia is said to be named for a king named Λυδός; the given name Lydia originally indicated ancestry or residence in the region of Lydia.

Bible
Lydia is a Biblical given name: Lydia of Thyatira, businesswoman in the city of Thyatira in the New Testament's Acts of the Apostles. She was the apostle Paul's first convert in Philippi and thus the first convert to Christianity in Europe. Lydia hosted Paul and Silas after their release from prison. It is possible that Lydia was the host for a house church during that time. According to Coleman Baker, "Lydia is described as a “worshipper of God” (probably synonymous with “God-fearer,” used elsewhere in Acts) “from the city of Thyatira” (located in Western Asia Minor) and “a dealer in purple cloth” (a luxury item in the ancient Mediterranean). She and her household are soon baptized and offer hospitality to the traveling preachers. Lydia's house becomes the site for the church in Philippi, with her as its host and perhaps leader.... According to the book of Acts, Paul and his associates founded the church in Phillipi when Lydia and her household were baptized. One might conjecture that several of the women from the “place of prayer” were among those who joined with Lydia in this new movement."

People
 Lydia Baxter (1809–1874), American poet
 Lydia Becker (1820–1890), British suffragette and amateur scientist
 Lydia Cabrera (1899–1991), Cuban anthropologist and poet
 Lydia Canaan, Lebanon-born pioneering singer-songwriter, humanitarian, and activist
 Lydia de Crescenzo, Italian fashion designer working as "Lydia de Roma"
 Lydia Maria Child (1802–1880), American abolitionist, women's rights activist, novelist and journalist
 Lydia Avery Coonley (1845 - 1924), American social leader, clubwoman and writer
 Lydia Cornell (born 1953), American actress, blogger and radio talk show host
 Lydia Davis (born 1947), American author
 Lydia Dunn, Baroness Dunn (born 1940), Hong Kong politician
 Lydia Echevarría (born 1931), Puerto Rican actress
 Lydia Hoyt Farmer (1842–1903), American author, women's rights activist
 Lydia Mary Fay (1804-1878), American missionary, educator, writer, and translator
 Lydia Rodríguez Fernández (born 1980), Spanish pop singer who participated in the 1999 Eurovision Song Contest
 Lydia Field Emmet (1866–1952), American painter
 Lydia Gibson (1891–1964), American artist
 Lydia Gromyko (1911–2004), Belarusian agriculturist
 Lydia Hatuel-Czuckermann  (born 1963), Israeli foil fencer
 Lydia Hearst (born 1984), American model and socialite
 Lydia Jacoby (born 2004), American swimmer
 Lydia Kavina (born 1967), Russian theremin player and conductor
 Lydia Ko (born 1997), Korean-born New Zealand Professional Golfer
 Lydia Koidula (1843–1886), Estonian poet
 Lydia Lamaison (1914-2012), Argentine actress
 Lydia Lassila (born 1982), Australian skier
 Lydia Lazarov (born 1946), Israeli yachting world champion
 Lydia Lindeque (1916–1997), South African actor
 Lydia Litvyak (1921–1943), Russian fighter pilot in World War II
 Lydia Lopokova, Baroness Keynes (1892–1981), Russian ballerina
 Lydia Lunch (born 1959), American No Wave singer
 Lydia Mackay (born 1977), American actress and voice actress
 Lydia Mei (1896–1965), Estonian painter
 Lydia Mendoza (1916–2007), American guitarist and singer of Tejano music
 Lydia Millet (born 1968), American author
 Lydia Night (born 2000), American punk musician
 Lydia Pense (born 1948), American singer
 Lydia Pinkham (1819–1883), American patent medicine manufacturer and businesswoman
 Lydia Polgreen (born 1975), American journalist
 Lydia Shum (1945–2008), Hong Kong actress and comedian
 Lydia Simoneschi (1908–1981), Italian actress and voice actress
 Lydia Stahl (1890), a Russian espionage agent
 Lydia H. Tilton (1839–1915), American journalist and temperance activist
 Lydia de Vega (1964–2022), Filipina former athlete
 Lydia Venieri (born 1964), Greek artist
 Lydia Louisa Anna Very (1823–1901), American author and illustrator
 Lydia Wahlström (1869–1954),  Swedish historian, author and feminist
 Lydia Weld (1878–1962), engineer and naval architect

Fictional characters
 Lydia, a character from John Flanagan's series of novels, Brotherband
 Lydia Sharp, a character from Silas House's novel, Southernmost, in which the character is symbolic of a fanatical Christian
 Lydia, a follower (housecarl) NPC in the video game The Elder Scrolls V: Skyrim
 Lydia, a character from The Walking Dead comic book series
 Lydia, a character from the television show Hotel Transylvania: The Series
 Lydia, the second portrait ghost from the Nintendo GameCube game Luigi's Mansion
 Lydia Aspen, in the 1952 novel Love for Lydia
 Lydia Wickham (née Bennet), a character from Jane Austen's novel, Pride and Prejudice
 Lydia Branwell, a character from the TV show Shadowhunters
 Lydia Brenner, a character in The Birds
 Lydia Brown, a character in The Birth of a Nation
 Lydia Davis, a character from the television series Revenge
 Lydia Deetz, a character in the 1988 feature film Beetlejuice and the subsequent television show Beetlejuice
 Lydia Douce, a barmaid in the "Sirens" chapter of James Joyce's 20th century novel, Ulysses
 Lydia Fox, a character from the Arthur television show
 Lydia González, a bullfighter from the 2002 film, Talk to Her
 Lydia Gwilt, the femme fatale in Wilkie Collins's novel, Armadale
 Lydia Hadley, mother in Ray Bradbury's short story, The Veldt
 Lydia Hillard, in the 1993 film Mrs. Doubtfire
 Lydia Karenin, a former character on the ABC soap opera General Hospital
 Lydia King, a character in Charles Bukowski's 1982 novel Ham On Rye
 Lydia Languish, a character in Richard Sheridan's first play, The Rivals
 Lydia Marlowe, a character in The Woman in Green
 Lydia Martin, a character from MTV TV show Teen Wolf played by Holland Roden
 Lydia Maxwell, a character from the 1987 movie Innerspace, portrayed by Meg Ryan
 Lydia Rodarte-Quayle, a character from Breaking Bad
 Lydia Tár, the titular character of the 2022 film Tár
 Lydia, Countess of Walden, a character in Ken Follett's 1982 novel The Man from St. Petersburg
 Lydia "Lyddie" Worthen, the main character of the 1991 historical novel Lyddie by Katherine Paterson and the 1993 TV movie based on it
 Raven Lydia Baxter, the titular character of That's So Raven
 Lydia, a neutral good goddess of music, light and knowledge in the Greyhawk setting of the Dungeons & Dragons fantasy roleplaying game
 Aunt Lydia, The Handmaid's Tale

Other
 HMS Lydia, a fictional ship captained by Horatio Hornblower in the C.S. Forester's novel The Happy Return (called Beat to Quarters in the US)
 , a US patrol vessel in commission from 1917 to 1919
 , a US cargo ship in commission from 1918 to 1919
 Lydia stone, a stone used to test the quality of gold and silver, a touchstone

See also 

 Lidia
Lidija
 Lidiya

References

English feminine given names
Greek feminine given names
German feminine given names
Given names